Lemps may refer to the following places in France:

 Lemps, Ardèche, a commune in the department of Ardèche
 Lemps, Drôme, a commune in the department of Drôme
 Le Grand-Lemps, a commune in the department of Isère